Erzhausen is a village and a municipality in southern Hesse, Germany. It is part of the district of Darmstadt-Dieburg. It has about 7,900 inhabitants (2020). Wixhausen, a borough of the City of Darmstadt, is just South of Erzhausen.

History 

Settlement in the area dates back to about 1500 B.C., as shown by several cairn burial sites found some kilometres west of the town.

The settlement itself is mentioned in documents from 900 A.D. onward under various names like 'Erardishusen', 'Erhartzhausen', 'Ebrichshusen' or 'Erndeshusen'. The oldest document of the Lorsch codex names it as 'Erhartshausen' ('Houses of Erhart').

After remaining a mostly unimportant farming village until the early 20th century, it grew strongly after the railway line from Frankfurt to Darmstadt was built several kilometers to the east of it. The habitation spread out towards it, and workers employed in the nearby cities (which could now be reached a lot easier) settled here.

Today, it is still mostly a residential village, with some commerce and office activities. There is a small seminary of the German Pentecostalism BFP movement situated in the town, Bible School Beröa also called  Theologisches Seminar Beröa .

Historic names 
 10. century:  Erhardeshusen
 about 1200:  Erhardeshusen
 about 1250:  Erharteshusen
 1264:  Erardishusen
 1273:  Erharthusen
 1273:  in villa Erharthusen
 1282:  Eradeshusen
 1282:  Erndeshusen; Ebrathshusen
 1331:  Erarshusen
 1331:  Irtzhusen
 1413:  Ebrichshusen;  Erarthusen
 1413:  Ehartzhusen
 1440:  Eretzhusen
 1446:  Erhartzhusen
 15. century:  Erczhussen
 1451:  Erhartshusen
 1452:  Erhartshusen
 1453:  Erhartshusen
 1454:  Erhartßhussen
 1454:  Erhartßhußen
 1497:  Ertzhusen
 1506:  Erhartzhausen
 1526:  Ertzhusen
 1541:  Erhartshaussen
 1549:  Erhartshausen
 1576:  Ertzhaussen
 1579:  Ertzhausen
 today: Erzhausen

Demography

Twin towns – sister cities 

 1997  Mnichovo Hradiště, Czech Republic
 2006  Incisa in Val d'Arno, Italy 
 2013  Malgrat de Mar, Spain
 2017  Ivanychi, Ukraine

Gallery

References

External links

Darmstadt-Dieburg
Grand Duchy of Hesse